Caulocera is a genus of moths in the subfamily Arctiinae. The genus was erected by George Hampson in 1900.

Species
 Caulocera crassicornis
 Caulocera xantholopha

References

External links

Lithosiini